is a Japanese actor, tarento, television presenter, newscaster, businessman and manager. He is a representative of the talent agency Sankei. He lives in Setagaya, Tokyo. He is the eldest of two brothers.

Sekiguchi's father is Shuji Sano, who was also an actor, and his brother is Mamoru Sano. His wife is singer Sachiko Nishida, and his son is actor and tarento Tomohiro Sekiguchi. Sekiguchi's grandfather is Kamijiro Sekiguchi (Konsan Sekiguchi) who was a steeplejack for the National Diet Building. His high school classmate was Ryuzo Hayashi, who was also an actor.

Filmography

TV programmes

NHK

Nippon TV

Tokyo Broadcasting System

Fuji Television

TV Asahi

TV Tokyo

Radio programmes

Stage

Films

Advertisements

Lyrics

Bibliography

References

External links

Hiroshi Sekiguchi at All Cinema 
Hiroshi Sekiguchi at Kinenote 

Hiroshi Sekiguchi at Movie Walker 
Hiroshi Sekiguchi at the TV Drama Database 
Dokuritsu Dedia Juku - Column 
 

Japanese male actors
Japanese television personalities
Japanese television presenters
Japanese television journalists
Japanese businesspeople
Japanese radio personalities
Japanese lyricists
Rikkyo University alumni
Businesspeople from Tokyo
1943 births
Living people